Dilnoza Rakhmatova (born 7 February 1998) is an Uzbekistani sprint canoeist.

She won a medal at the 2019 ICF Canoe Sprint World Championships.

References

1992 births
Living people
ICF Canoe Sprint World Championships medalists in Canadian
People from Chirchiq
Uzbekistani female canoeists
Canoeists at the 2018 Asian Games
Medalists at the 2018 Asian Games
Asian Games medalists in canoeing
Asian Games silver medalists for Uzbekistan
Asian Games bronze medalists for Uzbekistan
Canoeists at the 2020 Summer Olympics
Olympic canoeists of Uzbekistan
21st-century Uzbekistani women